Skip Palenik (born July 24th, 1946) is an American analytical microscopist, forensic scientist, lecturer, and author.  He is most famous for providing trace evidence analysis and forensic microscopy for many high-profile cases including the Oklahoma City Bombing, Unabomber investigation, Hillside Strangler investigation and the JonBenet Ramsey case, and for his contributions to books and television programs including TruTV's Forensic Files (to which he was a frequent contributor).

Career
Palenik has worked on many of the most famous murder and mystery cases in recent American memory.  His resume includes work on: the Atlanta child murders, the Air India Bombing, JonBenet Ramsey case, 1985 Narita International Airport bombing (Tokyo), Hillside Strangler (LA), Oklahoma City bombing, John Demjanjuk (Jerusalem), assassination of Martin Luther King Jr. (reinvestigation by U.S. House Select Committee on Assassinations), Unabomber, the disappearance of Helen Brach, the “Kiki” Camarena Murder Case and the Green River Serial Murders.

Palenik has also taught microscopy at Illinois Institute of Technology, the University of Illinois at Chicago, and the McCrone Research Institute, and has contributed to many books and publications.  In 1992, Palenik founded a limited liability company, Microtrace LLC, to provide microscopy, microchemistry, and forensic consulting services to a variety of clients including forensic laboratories and manufacturers.

References

American forensic scientists
Living people
1946 births